Investindustrial is a global private equity firm focused on buyouts of mid-market companies in Europe and selectively in North America. It was founded in 1990 by Andrea Campanini Bonomi out of an industrial conglomerate.

History 
Founded in 1990 by 	Andrea Campanini Bonomi out of an industrial conglomerate to introduce Anglo-Saxon methodology to Southern Europe, Investindustrial is now a global private equity firm focused on buyouts of mid-market companies in Europe and selectively in North America.

With more than €11 billion of raised fund capital, the firm’s investment subsidiaries seek to make control investments in mid-market companies and focuses on active ownership and buy-and-build in four core sectors: industrial manufacturing; healthcare and services; consumer; and technology. 

Investindustrial has a team of more than 165 employees on three continents with offices in London, Lugano, Luxembourg, Madrid, New York, Paris and Shanghai.

In December 2019, Investindustrial closed its seventh fund (Investindustrial VII) at the hard cap of €3.75 billion.

In May 2018, Investindustrial raised its debut lower mid-market fund, Investindustrial Growth, at the hard cap of €375 million. 

Investindustrial has been certified B Corp since 2020 and Best For The World (Governance) in 2021 and 2022.

Selected investments

Pre-2010 
 Gardaland: in April 2005, Investindustrial acquired Italy's largest amusement park Gardaland.
 Ducati: in January 2006, Investindustrial acquired a 30% stake in Italian motorbike group Ducati Motor Holding
 Permasteelisa: in September 2009, Investindustrial acquired Permasteelisa the world's largest player in the engineering, manufacturing and installation of architectural envelopes (“curtain walls”).

2010-2020 
 PortAventura: in September 2010, Investindustrial acquired a 50% shareholding in PortAventura.
 Euskaltel: in October 2012, private equity firms Investindustrial and Trilantic Europe acquired communications company Euskaltel.
 Aston Martin: in December 2012, Investindustrial bought a 37.5% stake in Aston Martin Lagonda.
 Polynt-Reichhold: in May 2017, Investindustrial and Black Diamond became partners in Polynt-Reichhold after the successful merger of Polynt and Reichhold.
 CEME: in December 2017, Investindustrial bought the control of Ceme Group in a €285 million deal.
 Design Holding: in October 2018, Investindustrial and The Carlyle Group established Design Holding, a global high-end design group.
 Jacuzzi Brands: in January 2019, Investindustrial bought Jupiter Holding I Corp., which operates Jacuzzi Brands and other spa and bath products brands.
 Morgan Motor Company: in March 2019, Investindustrial announced the acquisition of a majority stake in Morgan Motor Company.
 Neolith: in June 2019, Investindustrial announced the acquisition of a majority stake in Neolith.
 Natra: in July 2019, Investindustrial acquired the food company Natra.
 Knoll: in June 2020, Knoll announced a $164.0 million Convertible Preferred Equity investment by Investindustrial
 CSM Ingredients: in October 2020, Investindustrial acquired the bakery ingredients business CSM Ingredients.

2021 - 
 Guala Closures: in June 2021, Investindustrial announced the successful tender offer on Guala Closures.
 Targa Telematics: in June 2021, Investindustrial acquired a stake in Targa Telematics, an Italian software developer specialised in smart mobility 
 La Doria: in October 2021, Investindustrial has signed a purchase agreement for the acquisition of 63.13% of the share capital of La Doria S.p.A.
 Ermenegildo Zegna: in December 2021, Zegna Group & Investindustrial Acquisition Corp. completed the business combination to list world-renowned global luxury group Zegna on the New York Stock Exchange

References

External links 
 

Private equity firms of the United Kingdom
Financial services companies established in 1990